George Wilson Baillie (19 May 1919 – 21 July 2014) was a British-Canadian ice hockey player. He competed in the men's tournament at the 1948 Winter Olympics.

References

External links
 

1919 births
2014 deaths
Ice hockey players at the 1948 Winter Olympics
Ice hockey people from Saskatchewan
Olympic ice hockey players of Great Britain
People from Hill of Beath
British emigrants to Canada